The Human Comedy is a 1943 American comedy-drama film directed by Clarence Brown. It began as a screenplay by William Saroyan, who was expected to direct. After Saroyan was removed from the project, he wrote the novel of the same name and published it just before the film was released. Howard Estabrook was brought in to reduce the run time to two hours. The picture stars Mickey Rooney with Frank Morgan; also appearing in the film are James Craig, Marsha Hunt, Fay Bainter, Ray Collins, Van Johnson, Donna Reed and Jackie "Butch" Jenkins. Barry Nelson, Robert Mitchum and Don DeFore appear together as boisterous soldiers in uncredited supporting roles.

Plot
The film is the story of a teenaged Homer Macauley in high school, working part-time as a telegram delivery boy, in the fictional town of Ithaca, California, during World War II. The effects of the war on the "Home Front" over a year in Homer's life are depicted in a series of perceptive vignettes—some amusing, some grave, some ugly, some touching, some sentimental—involving himself, his family, friends and neighbors in his California hometown, and his brother Marcus, a Private in the U.S. Army. The storyline is introduced and directed by a narrator, Homer's father, who has been dead for two years.

Cast

The AFI catalog lists 75 actors, including the 21 principals given credit on screen.

Robert Mitchum (as Horse) and Don DeFore (as Texas) appear in small roles as soldiers who, with their buddy Fat, have a night off from training. Trying to meet girls and take in a movie, they meet Bess and Mary. Although they have character names and lines in the script (Mitchum portrays "Quentin"), both are uncredited. Carl Switzer, best known as "Alfalfa" in the Our Gang shorts, appears uncredited as Auggie, a friend of Ulysses.

Production
Saroyan wrote a film treatment and a screenplay that he expected to direct. He left the project when his 240-page script proved to be too long—approximately 4 hours long—and he was removed as director. Saroyan went home and turned his original script into a novel, which was published just before the film was released and became an instant best-seller.

Saroyan was not at all happy with the film as completed by Brown. Among the noticeable differences between the film and the novel are a more vivid characterization of the four-year-old Ulysses, stronger social criticism and far fewer sentimental scenes than were incorporated into the film by Estabrook and Brown.

Modern sources indicate that MGM chief Louis B. Mayer said that this was his favorite film.

According to the AFI catalog, music credited in the film included "All the World Will Be Jealous of Me", by Ernest R. Ball and Al Dubin, and "Leaning on the Everlasting Arms", words by E. A. Hoffman, music by A. J. Showalter, but they are not credited on screen. Music is important to the Macauley family and to those around them, including Marcus's Army buddies. The score is full of allusive phrases and songs, that were familiar to 1943 audiences, from the strains of the "Star-Spangled Banner" that open and close the film, to little Ulysses' fascination with "My Old Kentucky Home", to a long, rousing rendition of "Leaning on the Everlasting Arms", sung by the soldiers on the train, where one shot breaks the fourth wall and invites the audience to sing along to the last chorus. Alcoholic Mr. Grogan copes with the despair caused by the relentless stream of telegrams from the War Department by turning to songs — "Rock of Ages" and "Church in the Wildwood" among them — as well as cold water in the face and black coffee. Mrs. Sandoval rocks and croons "Cielito lindo" to the memory of the son she has just lost. Other pieces woven into the score are: "Where the River Shannon Flows", "When Irish Eyes Are Smiling", "Now the Day Is Over", "My Country 'Tis of Thee", "You're in the Army Now", "Git Along Little Dogies", "The Happy Farmer", "Polly Wolly Doodle", "Onward Christian Soldiers", "The Caissons Go Rolling Along", "Christ the Lord is Risen Today" and "A Dream", an old love song sung by Mary and Bess as Tobey and Homer approach the house with news of Marcus's death. In the scene where Tom and Diana Spangler drive through the Valley Festival, he points out the people wearing traditional costume, playing traditional music and dancing folk dances: "Greeks, Serbs, Russians, Poles, Spanish, Mexicans, Armenians, Swedes and all the rest".

Reception
The New York Times critic Bosley Crowther praised the film's performances, especially Rooney's, saying that "There is a tenderness and restraint in his characterization." But he chided the film for excessive sentimentality, saying it featured "some most charming bits of fine motion-picture expression and some most maudlin gobs of cinematic goo."

Variety commented that Saroyan's "initial original screenplay is a brilliant sketch of the basic fundamentals of the American way of life, transferred to the screen with exceptional fidelity."

According to TCM's Notes on the production, the reviewer for The Hollywood Reporter wrote: "the best picture this reviewer has ever seen," Daily Variety predicted it would be "one of the screen's immortals.” The Motion Picture Research Bureau gave it the best audience ratings. The Canadian Department of National Defence named it the best film of 1943.

The film made $2.8 million in the US and Canada and $1.0 million elsewhere resulting in a profit of $1.5 million.

Leonard Maltin gives the picture 3 1/2 out of 4 stars, describing it as: “Memorable Americana, faithfully adapted... Unfolds like a novel, with many lovely vignettes, and one of Rooney's best performances...”

Dennis Schwartz says the film: "outdoes Capra in cornball melodrama, but does it well...(It) gets the close-knit community mood right of small town America during World War II, and keeps it from becoming bloated with sentimentality (though it’s unquestionably sugary) ... (reminding) Americans of an innocent time when they believed they were warm-hearted decent people who cared about their country, community and others ... where one could advance by getting a good public education and the people in the country felt they could safely leave their house doors unlocked. It’s an America that probably no longer exists, which makes this film relic a memorable look back."

Rotten Tomatoes rates it 80 percent fresh.

Awards
It won the Oscar for Best Story and was nominated for Best Actor in a Leading Role (Mickey Rooney), Best Cinematography, Black-and-White, Best Director and Best Picture.

References

External links

 
 
 
 
 
 

1943 films
1943 drama films
American drama films
American black-and-white films
Films directed by Clarence Brown
Films set on the home front during World War II
Films that won the Academy Award for Best Story
Films set in California
Films with screenplays by Howard Estabrook
Films scored by Herbert Stothart
Films based on American novels
Metro-Goldwyn-Mayer films
World War II films made in wartime
1940s English-language films